The Lautze Mosque is a mosque in Sawah Besar, Jakarta, Indonesia.

History
The mosque was established in 1991 by Haji Abdul Karim Oei Foundation by renting a shop lot and named after Abdul Karim Oei, a prominent nationalist and Chinese Indonesians. It was then later expanded to two shop lots adjacent to each other in 1994 after receiving a grant from President Suharto. It was then inaugurated by Research and Technology Minister B. J. Habibie in the same year. In 2018, the mosque nameplate was displayed outside the building.

Architecture
The mosque is housed in a two adjacent shop lot buildings with red, yellow and green exterior colors. It has a total of three floors and can accommodate up to 300 worshippers. The ground floor houses the main prayer hall, the upper floor houses the additional prayer hall and the wudu area and the top most floor houses the administration office. It was designed with Chinese architectural style.

Transportation
The mosque is accessible within walking distance northeast of Sawah Besar Station of Kereta Api Indonesia.

See also
 Islam in Indonesia

References

1991 establishments in Indonesia
Central Jakarta
Chinese architecture in Indonesia
Mosques completed in 1991
Mosques in Jakarta